James Tunney (1892 – 11 May 1964) was an Irish Labour Party politician who served for seven terms in Seanad Éireann and for one term in Dáil Éireann.

He was elected to the 2nd Seanad by the Labour Panel in 1938, he was re-elected that year to the 3rd Seanad. At the 1943 general election, he was elected as a Labour Party Teachta Dála (TD) for the Dublin County constituency, but lost his seat at the 1944 general election.

In the same year, Tunney was returned to the 5th Seanad by the Labour Panel. In 1948 he was elected to the 6th Seanad by the Agricultural Panel, which also elected him to the 7th Seanad in 1951. In 1954, he was nominated by the Taoiseach, John A. Costello to the 8th Seanad. In 1957, following the defeat of the Second Inter-Party Government, he was elected to the Seanad for a seventh and final time, again by the Agricultural Panel.

He did not contest the 1961 election for the 10th Seanad. He died on 11 May 1964.

His son Jim Tunney was a Fianna Fáil TD from 1969 to 1992.

References

1892 births
1964 deaths
Labour Party (Ireland) TDs
Labour Party (Ireland) senators
Members of the 2nd Seanad
Members of the 3rd Seanad
Members of the 11th Dáil
Members of the 5th Seanad
Members of the 6th Seanad
Members of the 7th Seanad
Members of the 8th Seanad
Members of the 9th Seanad
Nominated members of Seanad Éireann